Ahnidzor, is a village in the Lori Province of Armenia. It belongs to the municipality of Tumanyan. The village is best known as the birthplace of writer Hrant Matevosyan.

References

Populated places in Lori Province